Grace Davies (born 1 February 1997) is an English singer-songwriter. She is an independent artist, previously signed to SYCO Music (Sony) before the label's demise in 2020. She is best known for her original song "Roots", which she performed during her first audition on the fourteenth series of The X Factor in 2017 - where she came runner up, mentored by Sharon Osbourne.

Career

2017: The X Factor 
In Davies' first audition for The X Factor, she performed an original song titled "Roots", and received four yes votes from the judges. She was mentored by Sharon Osbourne, along with fellow acts Alisah Bonaobra, Holly Tandy and Rai-Elle Williams. She was voted the winner of the Prize Fight in week 1 against Rak-Su, winning a trip to New York and a meet and greet with Pink at Madison Square Garden. Following the eliminations of Bonaobra in week 6 and Tandy and Williams in Week 8, Davies became Osbourne's last remaining act in the competition. She made the final on the weekend of 2 December 2017, alongside Kevin Davy White and Rak-Su. After Davy White was eliminated on Saturday's show, she was in the top two with Rak-Su and finished as the runner-up.

Since The X Factor she has released Roots and Wolves.

2018–2020: Friends with the Tragic 

On 12 January 2018, Davies confirmed she had signed to Simon Cowell's record label Syco Music. In September 2019, Davies and Tokio Myers performed as guests on America's Got Talent along with Stewart Copeland, performing "Safe and Sound", written by Tokio Myers featuring vocals from Grace Davies. On 24 January 2020, Davies announced that her debut single will be called "Invisible". The song was released on 31 January 2020. On 13 March 2020, Davies announced her second single called "Addicted to Blue", which was released on 20 March 2020. On the same day, she announced the release of her debut extended play, titled Friends with the Tragic, which was released on 26 June 2020. "Amsterdam" was released as the third single from the EP on 1 May 2020. "Just a Girl" was released as the fourth and final single from the EP on 26 June 2020 alongside the EP and the official music video. The EP debuted on the ITunes UK charts at number 52.

2021: I Wonder If You Wonder 
After her label Syco had ceased operations, Davies announced her first independent single called "i met a boy online". The song was released on 19 February 2021.

On 26 March 2021, Davies released a cover of The Goo Goo Dolls’ song "Iris".

On 28 May 2021, Davies released the song "testosterone".

"toothbrush" was released on 23 July 2021; it was the first song she made that she got a production credit on. She fought to get a proper production credit on the song because she was "determined to have [her] name above the door on every aspect of [her] music." She called her co-producer Marcus Andersson a "genuine guy with genuine talent," as well as revealing that LANY's "Thru These Tears" was a key inspiration for the song.

On 4 August 2021, Janet Devlin announced that Davies will support her on her Confessional Tour.

On 27 August 2021, Davies released the song "used to you".

On 8 October 2021, Davies released her X Factor audition song "roots", alongside its official video. It is Davies first official UK charted song peaking at number 89.

On 26 November 2021, Davies released her second extended play i wonder if you wonder, alongside the song "somebody".

2022: It Wasn’t Perfect, But We Tried 
On 24 June 2022, Davies announced that she was about to release her song "Wolves" (as performed on The X Factor) as the lead single from her upcoming third EP. The song was later released on 1 July 2022, later that week Davies revealed to an online podcast that this EP would be released in September (though the date is yet to be confirmed).

On 19 August 2022, Davies released the song "Already Gone" and announced the name of the EP, It Wasn't Perfect But We Tried on her social media - stating a release of the 7 October 2022. This date was revised and the EP was released a week later than planned on Friday, 14 October 2022. Davies released the single "Breathe" on the same day with the EP with its official video being released on 17 October 2022.

Discography

Extended plays

Singles

As lead artist

As featured artist

Songwriting credits

Concert tours

Supporting 
 The X Factor Live Tour (2018)
 Janet Devlin - The Confessional Tour (2021)

References 

1997 births
English women singer-songwriters
Living people
People from Blackburn
The X Factor (British TV series) contestants
21st-century English women singers
21st-century English singers
21st-century English people